Atashgah (also Romanized as Ātashgāh and Āteshgāh) is a village in Kamalabad Rural District, in the Central District of Karaj County, Alborz Province, Iran. At the 2006 census, its population was 520, in 137 families.

References 

Populated places in Karaj County